The Intouchables, also known as Untouchable in the UK and Ireland, is a 2011 French buddy comedy-drama film written and directed by Olivier Nakache & Éric Toledano. It stars François Cluzet and Omar Sy. Nine weeks after its release in France on 2 November 2011, it became the biggest box office hit in France, just passing the 2008 film Welcome to the Sticks. The film was voted the cultural event of 2011 in France with 52% of votes in a poll by Fnac. Until it was eclipsed in 2014 by Lucy, it was the most viewed French film in the world with 51.5 million tickets sold. The film received several award nominations. In France, the film won the César Award for Best Actor for Sy and garnered seven further nominations for the César Awards, including the César Award for Best Actor for Cluzet. Five percent of the movie's profit were given to Simon de Cyrène, an association that helps paralyzed people.

Plot
At night in Paris, Driss is driving Philippe's Maserati Quattroporte at high speed. Chased through the streets by the police, they are eventually cornered. Driss claims the quadriplegic Philippe must get to the emergency room urgently; Philippe pretends to have a seizure and the fooled police officers escort them. After arriving at the hospital, Driss drives away.

The story of friendship between the two men is then told as a flashback: Philippe, a wealthy quadriplegic owner of a luxurious hôtel particulier, and his assistant Magalie are interviewing potential live-in caregivers. Driss has no ambitions to get hired; he only attends to get a signature on a document proving his interview was rejected, in order to continue receiving his benefits. He is told to come back the next morning to collect his signed document.

The next day when Driss returns, Philippe's aide Yvonne greets him, telling him he has the job on a trial basis. Despite being uninterested and inexperienced, he does well caring for Philippe, albeit using unconventional methods. Driss learns the extent of his employer’s disability, aiding Philippe in every aspect of his life. A friend of Philippe's reveals that Driss was imprisoned for six months for robbery, but Philippe does not care about Driss's past. As Driss is the only one who does not treat Philippe with pity, he will not fire Driss as long as he does his job properly.

Philippe explains his disability resulted from a paragliding incident and that his wife died without bearing children. Gradually, Driss helps him to organise his private life, including disciplining his precocious adopted daughter Elisa. Driss discovers modern art, opera and starts painting. For Philippe's birthday, a private classical music concert is performed in his living room. Philippe educates Driss on famous classical pieces, but Driss only recognizes them as advert music or cartoon themes. Feeling the concert is too boring, Driss plays Earth, Wind & Fire's "Boogie Wonderland", livening up the party, with the guests also enjoying the music.

Discovering Philippe has a purely epistolary relationship with a woman called Eléonore who lives in Dunkirk, Driss encourages his employer to meet her, but Philippe fears her reaction when she discovers his disability. Driss persuades him to talk to her by phone. Philippe agrees to send a photo of himself in a wheelchair to her, but he hesitates and asks his aide, Yvonne, to send a picture as he was before his accident. A date between them is agreed, but at the last minute Philippe is too scared to meet Eléonore, the girl he secretly loves, and leaves with Yvonne before she arrives. Philippe then calls Driss, inviting him to fly with him in his Dassault Falcon 900 private jet for a paragliding weekend in the Alps.

Driss's cousin, Adam, in trouble with a gang, comes to fetch Driss at the mansion on the pretext of delivering mail. Overhearing, Philippe recognizes Driss's need to be supportive to his family and releases him from his job, suggesting he may not want to push a wheelchair all his life.

Driss returns home, joins his friends and manages to help his cousin. In the meantime new caregivers have replaced Driss but Philippe is not happy with any of them. His morale is very low and he stops taking care of himself. He grows a beard and looks ill. Worried, Yvonne calls Driss back.

Upon arrival Driss drives Philippe in the Maserati, which brings the story back to the initial police chase. After they elude the police, Driss takes Philippe to the seaside. Once Philippe has shaved and dressed, they arrive at a Cabourg restaurant on the sea front. Driss suddenly leaves the table, saying good luck to Philippe on his lunch date. A few seconds later Eléonore arrives. Emotionally touched, Philippe looks through the window and sees Driss outside, smiling at him. Driss bids Philippe farewell and walks away as Phillipe and Eléonore chat and enjoy each other's company.

The film ends with shots of Philippe Pozzo di Borgo and Abdel Sellou, the people on whom the story is based, together on a hillside, reminiscent of the paragliding scene earlier in the film. The closing caption states that the men remain close friends to this day.

Setting
The plot of the film is inspired by the true story of Philippe Pozzo di Borgo and his French-Algerien caregiver Abdel Sellou, discovered by the directors in À la vie, à la mort, a documentary film.

Cast

 François Cluzet as Philippe
 Omar Sy as Bakary "Driss" Bassari
 Audrey Fleurot as Magalie
 Anne Le Ny as Yvonne
 Clotilde Mollet as Marcelle
 Alba Gaïa Bellugi as Elisa
 Joséphine de Meaux as Nathalie Lecomte
 Cyril Mendy as Adama, Driss's cousin
 Christian Ameri as Albert
 Grégoire Oestermann as Antoine
 Marie-Laure Descoureaux as Chantal
 Absa Dialou Toure as Mina
 Salimata Kamate as Fatou
 Thomas Soliveres as Bastien
 Dorothée Brière-Meritte as Éléonore
 Caroline Bourg as Fred
 Émilie Caen as The gallerist

Reception
The film received mostly positive reviews from critics and holds a 75% approval rating at the film review aggregation site Rotten Tomatoes, based on 122 reviews, and an average score of 6.7/10. The consensus states, "It handles its potentially prickly subject matter with kid gloves, but Intouchables gets by thanks to its strong cast and some remarkably sensitive direction." On Metacritic, the film has a score of 57 out of 100, based on 31 ratings of professional critics. Audiences surveyed by CinemaScore gave the film an average grade of "A" on an A+ to F scale.

Critical response in the UK
The film divided critics in the UK. Upon the film's 21 September 2012 UK release under the title Untouchable,  The Independent called it "a third-rate buddy movie that hardly understands its own condescension....Why has the world flipped for this movie? Maybe it's the fantasy it spins on racial/social/cultural mores, much as Driving Miss Daisy did 20-odd years ago – uptight rich white employer learns to love through black employee's life-force. That was set in the segregationist America of the 1940s. What's this film's excuse?" Robbie Collin of The Telegraph called it "as broad, accessible and trombonishly unsubtle as a subtitled Driving Miss Daisy"; according to Collin, the "characters are conduits for charisma rather than great dramatic roles, but the horseplay between Sy and Cluzet is often very funny, and one joke bounces merrily into the next." Nigel Farndale, also of The Telegraph, said: "The film, which is about to be released in Britain, has been breaking box-office records in France and Germany, and one of the reasons seems to be that it gives the audience permission to laugh with, not at, people with disabilities, and see their lives as they have never seen them before."

Accolades
The film won the Tokyo Sakura Grand Prix award given to the best film at the Tokyo International Film Festival and the Award for Best Actor to both Francois Cluzet and Omar Sy in 2011. At the César Awards 2012, the film received eight nominations. Omar Sy received the César Award for Best Actor on 24 February 2012 for the role of Driss (defeating Jean Dujardin, nominated for The Artist) and being the first French African actor to receive this honor.

In September 2012, it was announced that The Intouchables had been selected as the French entry for the Best Foreign Language Oscar for the 85th Academy Awards. In December 2012, it made the January shortlist, but was ultimately not selected for inclusion among the final nominees.

Box office
After four weeks, by 25 November 2011, The Intouchables had already become the most-watched film in France in 2011. After sixteen weeks, more than 19 million people had seen the film in France. On 10 January 2012, The Intouchables set a record, having been number one for ten consecutive weeks since its release in France. The film has grossed $166 million in France and $444.7 million worldwide as of 12 May 2013.

On 20 March 2012, The Intouchables became the highest-grossing movie in a language other than English with $281 million worldwide. It broke the previous record set by the Japanese film Spirited Away ($274.9 million), also breaking the record for the highest-grossing French film, surpassing The Fifth Element ($263.9 million). In July 2012, it became the top grossing foreign language film of 2012 in North America, surpassing A Separation.

The film has also done well in several other European countries, topping charts in Germany for nine consecutive weeks, Switzerland for eleven weeks, Austria for six weeks, Poland for three weeks, and Italy, Spain and Belgium for one week, as of 20 May 2012.

 With more than 30 million tickets sold outside France it is the most successful French film shot in French since at least 1994.
 In the United States, it is the fourth highest-grossing French-language film since 1980.
 In Germany, it is the most successful French film shot in any language since at least 1968.
 In Italy, it is the most successful French film shot in French since at least 1997.
 In Spain, it is the second most successful French film shot in French since at least 1994 behind Asterix & Obelix Take on Caesar (3.7 million admissions) released in 1999.
 In South Korea, it is the most successful French film shot in French since at least 1994.
 In Switzerland, it is the most successful French film shot in any language and the second most successful film from any nationalities behind Titanic, since at least 1995.
 In Belgium, it is the second most successful French film shot in any language since at least 1996 behind Bienvenue chez les Ch'tis ( admissions).
 In Austria, it is the most successful French film shot in any language since at least 1994.
 In the Netherlands, it is the most successful French film shot in any language since at least 1994.
 In Poland, it is the fourth most successful French film shot in French since at least 1998 behind Amélie (758,201 admissions), Asterix at the Olympic Games (685,800 admissions) and Asterix & Obelix: Mission Cleopatra (680,010 admissions).
 In Israel, it is the most successful French film shot in French since at least 2002.
 In Canada (French), it is the fourth most successful French film shot in French since 1 January 2000 (as of 29 March 2012) behind Asterix & Obelix: Mission Cleopatra (651,582 admissions), Amélie (569,523 tickets) and The Chorus (364,052 tickets sold).
 In Portugal, with 146,000 tickets sold in 5 weeks, it is the 6th most successful French film shot in French since at least 1994.
 In Japan, it is the most successful French film ever.

Home media 
In the United States, the film released on DVD in March 2013. It grossed  in DVD sales, .

In the United Kingdom, it was 2013's second best-selling foreign language film on physical home video formats, second only to the Indonesian action film The Raid. It was later the UK's ninth best-selling foreign language film of 2016, and second best-selling French film (behind Victor Young Perez).

Television 
In the United Kingdom, it was watched by 213,500 viewers on BBC Two in 2016, making it the year's third most-watched foreign language film on UK television.

Soundtrack

 Ludovico Einaudi – "Fly" (3:20)
 Earth, Wind & Fire – "September" (3:33)
 Omar Sy, François Cluzet & Audrey Fleurot – "Des références..." (1:08)
 Ludovico Einaudi – "Writing Poems" (4:09)
 George Benson – "The Ghetto" (4:57)
 Omar Sy & François Cluzet – "L'arbre qui chante" (1:01)
 Terry Callier – "You're Goin' Miss Your Candyman" (7:18)
 François Cluzet & Omar Sy – "Blind Test" (2:21)
 Earth, Wind & Fire with The Emotions – "Boogie Wonderland" (4:45)
 Ludovico Einaudi – "L'origine nascosta" (3:12)
 Nina Simone – "Feeling Good" (2:53)
 Ludovico Einaudi – "Cache-cache" (3:51)
 Angelicum De Milan – "Vivaldi: Concerto pour 2 violons & Orchestra" (3:21)
 Ludovico Einaudi – "Una mattina" (6:41)

Remakes

Indian 

In 2015 it was announced that Vamsi Paidipally would be directing an Indian Telugu film adaptation titled Oopiri, which would also be shot in Tamil as Thozha. Both versions star Nagarjuna and Karthi as its male leads. They were released on 25 March 2016.

In 2014, rights to The Intouchables were sold to Bollywood filmmakers Karan Johar and Guneet Monga. Johar's Dharma Productions and Monga's Sikhya Entertainment announced that they would produce a Hindi remake, which would be directed by Mohit Suri. Saif Ali Khan, Varun Dhawan, Tamannaah Bhatia and Prakash Raj were reported to be starring in the film.

Spanish
Inseparables is a 2016 Argentinian remake written and directed by Marcos Carnevale.

English

In July 2011, in addition to acquiring distribution rights in English-speaking countries, Scandinavian countries and China, The Weinstein Company acquired the rights to remake The Intouchables in English. In June 2012, Paul Feig was slated to direct and write the script, with Chris Rock, Jamie Foxx and Idris Elba eyed for the role of Abdel, Colin Firth in talks for Phillip, and Jessica Chastain and Michelle Williams considered for a female lead.

By March 2013, Feig dropped out of directing, with Tom Shadyac in talks to replace him, and Chris Tucker was in consideration for Abdel. In October 2014, Kevin Hart was cast as Abdel, with Firth still attached as Phillip. In March 2016, it was announced that Bryan Cranston was cast, replacing Firth. Simon Curtis was to direct Cranston and Hart from a screenplay written by Feig. By August 2016, Curtis presumably dropped out of directing. Neil Burger was announced as his replacement. A script by Jon Hartmere would be used rather than Feig's work.

In January 2017, Nicole Kidman and Genevieve Angelson joined the cast of the film, then officially titled Untouchable. In February 2017, Aja Naomi King and Julianna Margulies joined the cast. On 2 August 2017, the film's title was changed to The Upside. The film was released on 11 January 2019, earning a box office of $125.9 million worldwide.

See also
 List of submissions to the 85th Academy Awards for Best Foreign Language Film
 List of French submissions for the Academy Award for Best Foreign Language Film

References

External links
 
 
 
 Intouchables at AlloCiné (French)
 Box-office Intouchables (French)

2011 films
French buddy comedy-drama films
2010s buddy comedy-drama films
2011 independent films
French independent films
2010s French-language films
Films about paraplegics or quadriplegics
Films featuring a Best Actor César Award-winning performance
Films featuring a Best Actor Lumières Award-winning performance
Films scored by Ludovico Einaudi
Gaumont Film Company films
2011 comedy films
2011 drama films
Films directed by Olivier Nakache and Éric Toledano
2010s French films
Films about disability